Ericeia brunnescens is a moth in the family Erebidae. It is found on Borneo, Sumatra and Java.

References

Moths described in 1880
Ericeia
Moths of Indonesia